Samsung SPH-M810 (known as Instinct S30, previously as Instinct Mini) is an Internet-enabled cell phone designed and marketed by Samsung and carried by Sprint Nextel from 2009. It uses a Haptic touchscreen interface, and three touchscreen buttons (from left to right - [back], [home], and [phone]). The Instinct, in addition to being a mobile phone, also functions as a camera phone, portable media player, text messenger, and a complete web browser and e-mail client.

References

Mobile phones introduced in 2009
Samsung mobile phones
Samsung smartphones
Personal digital assistants